The 2008 Sri Lanka roadside bombings were two separate roadside bombings that killed 32 people and injured 62 others on January 16, 2008. The first roadside bomb was aimed towards a civilian bus, with gunmen shooting at fleeing survivors and then retreating into the bush, killing farmers who encountered them. The second roadside bomb was aimed towards a military vehicle, injuring three soldiers. The Sri Lankan Government has blamed the Liberation Tigers of Tamil Eelam (LTTE) for the attacks.

See also
 2008 Fort Railway Station bombing
 2008 Piliyandala bombing
 Madhu school bus bombing

References

Attacks on civilians attributed to the Liberation Tigers of Tamil Eelam
Massacres in Sri Lanka
Liberation Tigers of Tamil Eelam attacks against buses
Liberation Tigers of Tamil Eelam attacks in Eelam War IV
Mass murder in 2008
Spree shootings in Sri Lanka
Terrorist incidents in Sri Lanka in 2008
January 2008 events in Asia
2008 murders in Sri Lanka